Colon is a village in Saunders County, Nebraska, United States. The population was 110 at the 2010 census. Amenities include a post office and bank branch. Colon is seven miles north of the county seat Wahoo.

History
First established in 1879, Colon removed to its current site in 1886 when the railroad was extended to that point. The town was named after Colon, Michigan, by the first postmaster, who was a native of that state. Colon was incorporated as a village in 1894.

Geography
Colon is located at  (41.297761, -96.606757).

Demographics

2010 census
As of the census of 2010, there were 110 people, 43 households, and 33 families living in the village. The racial makeup of the village was 100.0% White.

There were 43 households, of which 27.9% had children under the age of 18 living with them, 62.8% were married couples living together, 4.7% had a female householder with no husband present, 9.3% had a male householder with no wife present, and 23.3% were non-families. 18.6% of all households were made up of individuals, and 9.3% had someone living alone who was 65 years of age or older. The average household size was 2.56 and the average family size was 2.97.

The median age in the village was 44.3 years. 22.7% of residents were under the age of 18; 7.4% were between the ages of 18 and 24; 21.9% were from 25 to 44; 32.7% were from 45 to 64; and 15.5% were 65 years of age or older. The gender makeup of the village was 48.2% male and 51.8% female.

2000 census
As of the census of 2000, there were 138 people, 50 households, and 40 families living in the village. The population density was 1,043.5 people per square mile (409.9/km2). There were 54 housing units at an average density of 408.3 per square mile (160.4/km2). The racial makeup of the village was 99.28% White, and 0.72% from two or more races. Hispanic or Latino of any race were 7.25% of the population.

There were 50 households, out of which 36.0% had children under the age of 18 living with them, 70.0% were married couples living together, 4.0% had a female householder with no husband present, and 20.0% were non-families. 12.0% of all households were made up of individuals, and 8.0% had someone living alone who was 65 years of age or older. The average household size was 2.76 and the average family size was 3.08.

In the village, the population was spread out, with 27.5% under the age of 18, 8.0% from 18 to 24, 22.5% from 25 to 44, 25.4% from 45 to 64, and 16.7% who were 65 years of age or older. The median age was 39 years. For every 100 females, there were 106.0 males. For every 100 females age 18 and over, there were 92.3 males.

As of 2000 the median income for a household in the village was $28,333, and the median income for a family was $28,333. Males had a median income of $40,000 versus $20,417 for females. The per capita income for the village was $17,302. About 11.8% of families and 9.0% of the population were below the poverty line, including 8.8% of under eighteens and none of those over 64.

Notable people
American lawyer and civil servant Emmett Louis Murphy was born in Colon.

References

Villages in Saunders County, Nebraska
Villages in Nebraska